SS Eugene T. Chamberlain was a Liberty ship built in the United States during World War II. She was named after Eugene T. Chamberlain, the commissioner of the Federal Bureau of Navigation from 1893–1915.

Construction
Eugene T. Chamberlain was laid down on 19 June 1944, under a Maritime Commission (MARCOM) contract, MC hull 2368, by J.A. Jones Construction, Brunswick, Georgia; she was sponsored by Mrs. L.D. Cox, and launched on 1 August 1944.

History
She was allocated to the Isbrandtsen Steamship Co. Inc., on 13 August 1944. On 8 October 1945, she was laid up in the National Defense Reserve Fleet in the James River Group, Lee Hall, Virginia. On 3 March 1966, she was sold for "non-transportation use" (NTU) to Northern Metals Co., for $47,750. She was removed from the fleet on 29 March 1966.

References

Bibliography

 
 
 
 
 

 

Liberty ships
Ships built in Brunswick, Georgia
1944 ships
Wilmington Reserve Fleet